Peter Watson (born 1952) is a British photographer best known for his large format landscapes of rural Britain.

Background 
Born in Wallasey in February 1952 Watson’s photographic career started in his teenage years when he photographed and produced his own black & white prints in an improvised darkroom. They were sold in a local gallery and this early success encouraged him to pursue a career as a photographer. He studied art and graphic design and in 1993 obtained a diploma in photography from the New York Institute of Photography. Watson specialises in landscape and available light photography using large format Fujifilm with a 5x4 view camera.

Before becoming a full-time professional landscape photographer Watson worked in advertising and commercial photography. He now teaches lectures and is a photography instructor with VSP workshops. He is the author of several practical photography books and his work has featured in many publications including BBC's Radio Times magazine, Cheshire Life and Outdoor Photography. In 2008 Watson was chosen as a contributor to the publication Icons of England, produced by The Campaign to Protect Rural England (CPRE). He also runs a photo agency and picture library specialising in images of rural Britain.

Bibliography 

 Watson, Peter (2013). Views Across the Landscape Ammonite Press

References

External links 
 Peter Watson
 British Landscapes

1952 births
Living people
Photographers from Cheshire
People from Wallasey
Nature photographers